Jazz Poet is an album by jazz pianist Tommy Flanagan, with bassist George Mraz, and drummer Kenny Washington.

Recording and music
The album was recorded on January 17 and 19, 1989, at Van Gelder Studio, Englewood Cliffs, New Jersey.

Reception
The AllMusic reviewer commented that "Flanagan is at the peak of his powers. Never flashy, never showy, this is just outstanding music performed by a true master". The Penguin Guide to Jazz stated that "The title's a fair passport entry for Tommy; beautifully judged and perfectly performed".

Track listing (CD releases)
"Raincheck" (Billy Strayhorn) – 4:58  
"Lament" (J. J. Johnson) – 5:07  
"Willow, Weep for Me" (Ann Ronell) – 6:01
"Caravan" (Duke Ellington, Juan Tizol, Irving Mills) – 6:21  
"That Tired Routine Called Love" (Matt Dennis) – 6:47  
"Glad to Be Unhappy" (Richard Rodgers, Lorenz Hart) – 4:45  
"St. Louis Blues" (W. C. Handy) – 6:32  
"Mean Streets" (originally titled "Verdandi") (Tommy Flanagan) – 4:10  
"I'm Old Fashioned" (Jerome Kern, Johnny Mercer) – 5:40  
"Voce A Buso" (Antonio Carlos & Jocasi) – 4:49

Personnel
Tommy Flanagan – piano
George Mraz – bass
Kenny Washington – drums

References

1989 albums
Tommy Flanagan albums
Albums recorded at Van Gelder Studio
Timeless Records albums